Gulab Singh Lodhi was a revolutionary who participated in the Indian independence movement.

Life

Gulab Singh Lodhi was born in the year 1903 at village named (Chandika Khera) Fatehpur Chaurasi, Unnao district in Uttar Pradesh. He was born in a Lodhi Rajput family. His father, Thakur Ram Ratan Singh Lodhi, was a farmer. Little is known about his childhood. He grew up in the turbulent era when the fervor of the freedom movement was at its peak. Lodhi took active part in the political activities against the British rule.

Gulab Singh Lodhi participated in a procession at Lucknow which marched to the Aminabad Park for hoisting the tri–colour in August 1935. The park was surrounded by British troops in order to prevent the hoisting of the flag. Gulab Singh Lodhi defied the show of armed force and climbed a tree with the Tricolour. As he was hoisting the flag atop the tree, he was shot dead by a British officer in August 1935. He died at Jhandewala Park in Aminabad, Lucknow.

Legacy
Indian government issued a postal stamp in honour of 'Gulab Singh Lodhi' on December 23 of the year 2013.

A statue of him was erected in the park in 2004 but by 2009 was in a state of disrepair.

References 

1935 deaths
Indian independence activists from Uttar Pradesh
People from Unnao
1903 births